Princess Anne de Bauffremont-Courtenay (1 April 1919 – 15 February 1945) was a French resistance fighter of the Second World War.

She was born in Paris, France, the daughter of Pierre d'Alcantara de Bauffremont, Prince-Duc de Bauffremont-Courtenay and Therese Chevrier. 
She was a member of the French Resistance and was arrested by the Gestapo on July 6, 1944 in Paris, then locked up for three weeks in Fresnes Prison, where she was interrogated under torture but did not speak. She was deported by the last train departing from Île-de-France on August 15, 1944 and interned in Ravensbrück where she died of dysentery. There is a plaque in her memory at the Picpus Cemetery in Paris. She was the elder sister of Prince Jacques de Bauffremont.

References

People who died in Ravensbrück concentration camp
1919 births
1945 deaths
French civilians killed in World War II